Era Records was an independent American record label in Hollywood, California. It was founded by Herb Newman and Lou Bedell in 1955 as a pop, country and western, and jazz label. In 1959 Bedell sold his interest in the label to Newman. Era had a No. 1 hit in 1956 with Gogi Grant's "The Wayward Wind" written by Newman. Musicians with hits on Era include Ketty Lester ("Love Letters"), Larry Verne ("Mr. Custer"), Donnie Brooks ("Mission Bell"), Dorsey Burnette ("Tall Oak Tree"), Art & Dotty Todd ("Chanson D' Amour"), and The Castells ("So This Is Love"). Era distributed other labels, including Monogram, Gregmark, and Eden. From 1969 to 1971, Era was associated with Happy Tiger, which reissued and distributed some of Era's oldies. In 1972, Newman added the RTV label which released the psychedelic album Mu. In the mid-1970s Newman sold the Era label and catalog to K-tel. In 1993, K-tel began reissuing some of the early Era material using the original Era label and logo.

Notable artists
 Jewel Akens
 Donnie Brooks
 Dorsey Burnette
 The Castells
 The Crescents
 Keith Colley
 Gogi Grant
 Ketty Lester
 Colleen Lovett
 The Moments
 Johnny Rivers
 The Sentinals
 Mike Smith
 Larry Verne
 Ty Wagner
 Bob Wilson

Other labels 
Dore Records (Teddy Bears, Jan & Dean, Hudson & Landry)
Happy Tiger Records (Mason Proffit, Them)
Monogram Records (Chris Montez, Kathy Young)
RTV
Trey Records
Zen Records (Pastel Six)

See also
 List of record labels

References

Record labels established in 1955
Defunct record labels of the United States
Pop record labels
American country music record labels
Jazz record labels
American independent record labels
Companies based in Los Angeles County, California
1955 establishments in California